William Hockey (born 1989) is an American engineer and entrepreneur from San Luis Obispo, California. He is best known for having co-founded financial services company Plaid which he started with co-founder Zachary Perret.

Biography 
Hockey was born in San Luis Obispo, California. He attended the Thacher School and Emory University where he majored in computer science and ISOM. He spent a summer interning at Bain & Co. where he met his future co-founder Zachary Perret.

When he was 21, Hockey founded Plaid with Perret in New York City, initially focusing on consumer financial services. They moved into financial infrastructure after being frustrated with the difficulty of building in financial services. After a year they moved to San Francisco after raising seed money from Spark Capital, NEA and Google Ventures. Plaid subsequently raised over $300 million additional investors including Goldman Sachs, Mary Meeker at KPCB, American Express, Visa and Mastercard.

Early in 2020, Visa agreed to buy Plaid for $5.3 billion, making Hockey the youngest individual to sell a company for more than $5 billion.  The Department of Justice sued to block the deal  and in 2021 the companies mutually decided to end the merger. 
A few months later, Plaid raised a $425 million Series D funding round, boosting its valuation to $13.4 billion.  While Hockey has stepped down in his day-to-day role at Plaid, he remains on the board of directors. 

In April 2022, Hockey and his wife Annie Hockey co-founded Column, the only nationally chartered bank built to enable developers and builders to create new financial products.

References 

1989 births
American engineers
Living people